Torre Baró  Vallbona is a station on line 11 of the Barcelona Metro, serving the neighbourhoods Torre Baró and Vallbona of the Nou Barris district of Barcelona.

While most of this short line is underground and single-track, Torre Baró-Vallbona is open and, as the middle station on the line, has a double track to permit trains to pass one another.

Inaugurated in 2003 with the rest of the line, the station is located in hilly terrain, with the result that it has two accesses, one above and one below the station. The former is situated on Carrer Sant Feliu de Codines; the latter, on Avinguda de Vallbona, gives access to the Renfe main line station Torre Baró-Ciutat Meridiana-Vallbona, serving Rodalies Barcelona commuter lines R3, R4, and R7 and long-distance line Ca4.

See also
Torre del Baró railway station
List of Barcelona Metro stations

External links
Torre Baró-Vallbona - trenscat.cat

Railway stations in Spain opened in 2003
Nou Barris
Barcelona Metro line 11 stations